The 1987 Grand Prix d'Automne was the 81st edition of the Paris–Tours cycle race and was held on 11 October 1987. The race started in Créteil and finished in Chaville. The race was won by Adri van der Poel of the PDM team.

General classification

References

1987 in French sport
1987
1987 Super Prestige Pernod International